"Un angelo disteso al sole/ Un ángel como el sol tú eres" is a song by Italian singer-songwriter Eros Ramazzotti, released on 12 October 2012 as the lead single from the album Noi. A Spanish-language version of the single, titled "Un ángel como el sol tú eres", was also released to launch the Hispanic edition of the album, Somos.

The song was written by Ramazzotti with Luca Chiaravalli and Saverio Grandi.

It has since been covered in Greek by The Voice of Greece winner Maria Elena Kyriakou.

Track listing
"Un angelo disteso al sole" – digital download
 "Un angelo disteso al sole" – 3:23

"Un ángel como el sol tú eres" – digital download
 "Un ángel como el sol tú eres" – 3:22

Charts and certifications

Weekly charts

Year-end charts

Certifications

References

Eros Ramazzotti songs
2012 singles
2012 songs
Songs written by Eros Ramazzotti